In Greek mythology, Androdamas (Ancient Greek: Ἀνδροδάμας means 'man-taming') was the Sicyonian son of Phlias and Chthonophyle, daughter of King Sicyon.

Note

References 

 Pausanias, Description of Greece with an English Translation by W.H.S. Jones, Litt.D., and H.A. Ormerod, M.A., in 4 Volumes. Cambridge, MA, Harvard University Press; London, William Heinemann Ltd. 1918. . Online version at the Perseus Digital Library
 Pausanias, Graeciae Descriptio. 3 vols. Leipzig, Teubner. 1903.  Greek text available at the Perseus Digital Library.

Sicyonian characters in Greek mythology